Greenwich Museum may refer to several museums in London:

National Maritime Museum
Greenwich Heritage Centre
Fan Museum
Greenwich Visitor Centre